Bente Hoel is a former Norwegian curler.

Teams

References

External links
 

Living people
Norwegian female curlers
Norwegian curling champions
Year of birth missing (living people)